Mother Marie Helene Franey, S.P., (July 29, 1898 – November 23, 1953) was the Superior General of the Sisters of Providence of Saint Mary-of-the-Woods, Indiana from 1948-1953. In 1952, she was appointed by the Sacred Congregation of Religious in Rome to serve on an International Commission of 40 superior generals. She was one of three superior generals from the United States to serve on this Commission.

Early life
She was born Helena Agnes Franey on July 29, 1898 in Galesburg, Illinois, to Michael D. and Margaret (Connerton) Franey. Helena was one of six children. Because of Michael's occupation as superintendent of workshops of the Chicago, Burlington and Quincy Railroad, the family moved often. They spent some time in Jackson, Michigan, moved to Columbus, Ohio, and settled for a time in Elkhart, Indiana. She attended Edinboro State Normal School in Edinboro, Pennsylvania before the family sent Helena to attend high school in Saint Mary-of-the-Woods, Indiana.

Both Michael and Margaret had sisters who were Sisters of Providence (Sister Mary Helena Franey and Sister Louis Joseph Connerton), so sending Helena there was a sensible decision. However, it was still a surprise when Helena decided to enter the convent herself. (Later, two of Helena's brothers would enter the priesthood, becoming Father John T. Franey and Monsignor Louis J. Franey.)

Helena entered the congregation on September 24, 1918, professed first vows in 1921 and took final vows in 1926, taking the religious name of Sister Marie Helene. She taught high school from 1920 through 1944 at Marywood Academy in Evanston, Illinois; Providence High School in Chicago; St. Augustine in Fort Wayne, Indiana; and Saint Mary-of-the-Woods Academy. From 1928-1929, Franey took a break from teaching to study Latin at Indiana University and earn her master's degree. She would later study at the Institute of Canon Law at Saint Louis University in Missouri.

In administration
In 1944, Franey was elected a councillor of the Congregation. In 1948, she succeeded Mother Mary Bernard Laughlin as the community's general superior, earning the title of Mother Marie Helene.

As general superior, Franey established Our Lady of Providence Junior-Senior High School in Clarksville, Indiana, and furnished sisters to minister in Indianapolis; Somerville, Massachusetts; Chicago; Plainfield, Indiana; and Terre Haute, Indiana.

Franey and another Sister of Providence, Sister Francis Joseph, visited Rome during the Holy Year of 1950. In 1952, Franey and Sister Catherine Celine became the first Sisters of Providence to travel by air when they flew from Washington, D.C., to Indiana. That year, Franey was one of six general superiors to plan the First National Congress of Religious, held at University of Notre Dame in Indiana.

Franey died in office on November 23, 1953, of an acute heart attack following a short illness. A shrine to Our Lady of Fatima on the motherhouse grounds at Saint Mary-of-the-Woods is dedicated in her honor.

Works
 The Idea of the Early Christians Concerning Death as Shown in Catacomb Inscriptions, 1929
 The Roman Forum in the Time of Cicero, 1930

References

 

 

 

1953 deaths
20th-century American Roman Catholic nuns
Sisters of Providence of Saint Mary-of-the-Woods
1898 births
People from Galesburg, Illinois
Catholics from Illinois